Yin Qiao (born 2 July 1985) is a Chinese biathlete. She competed in two events at the 2006 Winter Olympics.

References

External links

1985 births
Living people
Biathletes at the 2006 Winter Olympics
Chinese female biathletes
Olympic biathletes of China
Place of birth missing (living people)
Asian Games medalists in biathlon
Biathletes at the 2007 Asian Winter Games
Asian Games gold medalists for China
Medalists at the 2007 Asian Winter Games
Sportspeople from Liaoyang
Sport shooters from Liaoning
Skiers from Liaoning